Hoeflea siderophila is a neutrophilic iron-oxidizing, motile bacteria with a single polar flagellum, from the genus Hoeflea which was isolated from the Staraya Russa Resort in the Novgorod region in Russia.

References

Rhizobiaceae
Bacteria described in 2012